The 1970–71 All-Ireland Senior Club Football Championship was the inaugural staging of the All-Ireland Senior Club Football Championship since its establishment by the Gaelic Athletic Association. The championship began on 13 September 1970 and ended on 21 November 1971.

On 21 November 1971, East Kerry won the championship following a 5-09 to 2-07 defeat of Bryansford in the All-Ireland final at Croke Park. It remains their only championship title.

Results

Connacht Senior Club Football Championship

First round

Semi-finals

Final

Leinster Senior Club Football Championship

First round

Second round

Railyard and Gracefield received byes in this round.

Semi-finals

Final

Munster Senior Club Football Championship

First round

Semi-finals

Final

Ulster Senior Club Football Championship

Preliminary round

Quarter-finals

Semi-finals

Final

All-Ireland Senior Club Football Championship

Semi-finals

Final

Championship statistics

Miscellaneous

 Bryansford became the first team to win back-to-back Ulster Club Championship titles.
 East Kerry became the first team to win three Munster Club Championship titles.

References

1970 in Gaelic football
1971 in Gaelic football